Colleen Murphy (born 1954 in Rouyn-Noranda, Quebec) is a Canadian screenwriter, film director and playwright. She is best known for works including her plays The December Man, which won the Governor General's Award for English-language drama at the 2007 Governor General's Awards, and Beating Heart Cadaver, which was a shortlisted nominee for the same award at the 1999 Governor General's Awards, and the film Termini Station, for which she garnered a Genie Award nomination for Best Original Screenplay at the 11th Genie Awards.

Life and career
Murphy was a student at the Canadian Film Centre in the 1990s, and has also directed numerous films, both short films and feature films. Her first feature film as a director, Shoemaker, received two prizes from the Mannheim-Heidelberg Film Festival, and garnered two acting nominations at the 18th Genie Awards. Her second feature film, Desire, also garnered two acting nominations at the 22nd Genie Awards.

She has served as playwright in residence at a variety of institutions, including the Factory Theatre in Toronto, Ontario; the Citadel Theatre in Edmonton, Alberta; the Finborough Theatre in London, England and the University of Guelph. She was named playwright in residence at the University of Alberta's theatre department in June 2014.

Personal life
Murphy was born in Rouyn-Noranda, Quebec, and raised in Northern Ontario.

She was married to filmmaker Allan King from 1987 until his death in 2009.

Works

Films
Termini Station (1989)
Putty Worm (1993)
The Feeler (1995)
Shoemaker (1996)
Desire (2000)
War Holes (2002)
Girl with Dog (2005)
Out in the Cold (2008)

Plays
Fire Engine Red (1985)
All Other Destinations Are Cancelled (1987)
Pumpkin Eaters (1990)
Down in Adoration Falling (1994)
Beating Heart Cadaver (1998)
The Piper (2002)
The December Man (2007)
The Goodnight Bird (2011)
Pig Girl (2012)
Armstrong's War (2013)
The Breathing Hole (2017), Commissioned by Stratford Festival

References

External links

1954 births
Governor General's Award-winning dramatists
Canadian women dramatists and playwrights
Canadian women film directors
Canadian radio writers
Women radio writers
20th-century Canadian screenwriters
People from Rouyn-Noranda
Writers from Quebec
Writers from Ontario
Canadian women screenwriters
Living people
Canadian Film Centre alumni
20th-century Canadian dramatists and playwrights
21st-century Canadian dramatists and playwrights
20th-century Canadian women writers
21st-century Canadian women writers
Anglophone Quebec people
21st-century Canadian screenwriters